Yoslam Muñoz (born 24 January 1980) is a Cuban volleyball player.

She was a member of the Cuba women's national volleyball team. She participated at the 2001 FIVB World Grand Prix.

References

External links 
 Player bio, FIVB

1980 births
Living people
Cuban women's volleyball players
Place of birth missing (living people)